The Foxjet ST600 was a small business jet under development in the United States in the late 1970s. Problems with development, particularly in finding a suitable powerplant, caused the project to be abandoned before any substantial work on the prototype had been done, but the concept proved to be ahead of its time, foreshadowing the very light jets of thirty years later.

Design and development
The ST600 was of familiar business jet configuration, with a low wing, cruciform tail, swept flying surfaces, and engines mounted on pods on the sides of the rear fuselage. The intentions of the project were to create a practical business jet small enough and light enough to take advantage of smaller airfields at a cost of around half of what full-size business jets of the day were selling for. Fuel costs were touted as being as low as nine cents a mile in 1977, compared to fifty cents a mile or higher for contemporary aircraft.

73 orders for the aircraft were taken with Bill Lear ordering the first example.

Three mockups were constructed and were widely displayed at aviation shows around the United States in the late 1970s by Tony Fox with slipping first flight schedules. The project got as far as Foxjet contracting Aeronca to construct the prototype. The engines, however, proved a major stumbling block. The tiny Williams Research type WR44 turbofan that had made the project possible received certification for use in a passenger-carrying aircraft, but due to its selection as the powerplant for cruise missiles, the United States government blocked non-military use of the engine. Without a suitable alternative available, the project could not proceed.

In 2006, a Foxjet mockup was exhibited at the AOPA expo at Palm Springs, Florida by Millennium Aerospace, which had purchased rights to the design in May. The company announced plans to resurrect the design and market it with Pratt & Whitney Canada PW615 engines.

The original prototype was eventually purchased by Lyle Anderson, of Princeton, Minnesota from a used motorcycle dealership in Minneapolis and prior to that, it stood in front of a car dealership. In 2010 it was put in Anderson's front yard, and was a participant in the Rum River Festival parade prior to relocation to Princeton Airport.

Specifications (as designed)

See also

References

External links
 Luc Van Bavel Design website Foxjet history page
 EAA Foxjet news
 Minijets website Foxjet ST-600 page

1970s United States business aircraft